Mayflower AI sea drone, or Mayflower Autonomous Ship, or Mayflower 400 (MAS400) is an autonomous research vessel that aims to cross the Atlantic without human crew or assistance. It is named after the Mayflower sailing ship, that carried English and Dutch Pilgrims onboard from England to New England between September and November 1620. Taking the same route, it was originally intended to set sail in September 2020 in time for the 400th anniversary.

A three-week voyage is planned; the Mayflower 400 will sail from Plymouth UK , navigate through the Isles of Scilly and over the site of the sunken Titanic to land in Plymouth, Massachusetts. The Mayflower Autonomous Ship has a highly trained “captain” and a “navigator” knowledgeable in the rules of avoiding collisions at sea.   Both functions are controlled by artificial intelligence (AI).

MAS400 began its first transatlantic attempt on June 15. Only three days later, the autonomous ship had to return to England after suffering mechanical problems.

The Mayflower's second attempt began April 27, 2022, departing from England bound for Virginia. After about one month at sea, the vehicle "developed an issue with the charging circuit for the generator starter batteries." The decision was made to switch to backup navigation and divert to Halifax, Nova Scotia.

The 15-meter long aluminum trimaran is solar-powered and is capable of speeds of up to 10 knots (20 km/h). It has a back up diesel generator. The ship cost $1.3 million to build and is owned by the not for profit marine research organization ProMare in partnership with computer-tech company IBM.

The ship will sample the water for pollutants and study marine life during its voyage. It will also trial its computer systems.

References

External links
Official websites

Autonomous ships
Research vessels
Applications of artificial intelligence